Tatrang, Tatirang is a town in Qiemo / Qarqan County, Bayingolin Mongol Autonomous Prefecture, Xinjiang, China.


History
In 1969, Tuanjie Commune was established.

In 1980, Tuanjie Commune became Tatrang Commune.

In 1984, Tatrang Commune became Tatrang Township.

In 1986, an 800-year old manuscript copy of Romance of the Western Chamber and twenty-seven other documents were stumbled upon in Tatrang (Tatirang).

On October 20, 2014, Tatrang Township became Tatrang Town and the boundaries of the town were adjusted adding  of land previously administered directly by the county government to the administration of Tatrang.

Geography
Tatrang is located on the Qiemo / Qarqan River. In 2014,  of land was added to Tatrang.

Administrative divisions

Tatrang includes five villages:

Villages:
Bashitatirang (Bashita Tirangcun) 
Taitukule / Taitukuole (Taitu Kuolecun;  / ) 
Serikebuyang (Serike Buyangcun;) 
Ayaketatirang (Ayake Tatirangcun) 
Aderesiman (Adere Simancun)

Demographics 

, 80% of the residents of Tatrang Township were Uyghur.

Historical maps

Notes

References

Populated places in Xinjiang
Township-level divisions of Xinjiang
Qiemo County